Augustin Bizimungu (born 28 August 1952) is a former general of the Rwandan Armed Forces (FAR). On 16 April 1994, at the start of the Rwandan genocide, he was appointed chief of staff of the army and promoted to the rank of major general.

Biography
Bizimungu was born in Byumba préfecture, Mukaranje Commune, Mugina Secteur, Nyange Cellule, Rwanda.

An ethnic Hutu, Bizimungu held the rank of lieutenant colonel in the FAR on 6 April 1994. Some days later, in the wake of Déogratias Nsabimana's death alongside Juvénal Habyarimana, Bizimungu was promoted to major general and appointed as chief of staff of the Rwandan Army of the FAR, replacing Marcel Gatsinzi.

Upon fleeing the country following the Rwandan Patriotic Front (RPF) victory, he reportedly declared that "The RPF will rule over a desert."

On 12 April 2002, the International Criminal Tribunal for Rwanda (ICTR) issued an arrest warrant for Bizimungu, who was apparently working with the Angolan rebel movement UNITA. In August 2002, he was arrested by the Angolan government and taken to the U.N. War Crimes Tribunal in Tanzania.
The trial adjourned until September 2008, whereupon Bizimungu was tried along with fellow FAR officers Augustin Ndindiliyimana (Chief of Staff of the National Gendarmerie), François-Xavier Nzuwonemeye (Commander of the Reconnaissance Battalion of the Rwandan Army) and Innocent Sagahutu (Second-in-Command of the Reconnaissance Battalion of the Rwandan Army). Bizimungu was sentenced to thirty years in prison for his part in the genocide on 17 May 2011. 

Bizimungu is portrayed by Fana Mokoena in the 2004 movie Hotel Rwanda.

References 

1952 births
Living people
20th-century criminals
Hutu people
People from Northern Province, Rwanda
People convicted by the International Criminal Tribunal for Rwanda
Rwandan people convicted of genocide
Rwandan generals